West Virginia Route 10 is a north–south route from Cabell County to Mercer County in the western and southern regions of West Virginia.  Mostly a two-lane, winding highway with no shoulders, Route 10 is considered to be one of substandard design when compared to modern standards. Nevertheless, it serves as a major arterial highway in the state, carrying a substantial amount of traffic volume.  Tractor-trailers have a particularly difficult time negotiating many of the route's sharp, hairpin curves. 

Between the towns of West Hamlin and Man, most of the route closely parallels the course of the Guyandotte River.  Thus, it follows a very winding course, with a solid rocks just inches from the roadway, and is thus very dangerous. An upgrade from Man to Logan to a four-lane highway built to the same standards as the Appalachian Corridor System was completed the first part of September 2017.  From Man to Lacoma, the route follows Huff Creek, then turns south to Oceana. Then it follows a south-eastern path parallel to several small streams and terminates into US 19 just north of Princeton, West Virginia.

Notes 

In Huntington, portions of the highway are named Troy Brown Way and Hal Greer Boulevard in honor of two notable local professional athletes.

Major intersections

WV 10 Alternate

West Virginia Route 10 Alternate is a four-mile-long north–south road near Barboursville, West Virginia connecting WV 10 to the south and US 60 to the north. It acts as an alternative route to Huntington and eliminates many of the curves that plague WV 10 south of Interstate 64 to the WV 10 Alternate junction.

References 

010
Transportation in Mercer County, West Virginia
Transportation in Wyoming County, West Virginia
Transportation in Logan County, West Virginia
Transportation in Lincoln County, West Virginia
Transportation in Cabell County, West Virginia